Spina is an Etruscan port city established by the end of the 6th century BCE on the Adriatic, Italy.

Spina may also refer to:

Places

Italy
 Spina di Gualdo, a mountain of Marche
 Monti la Spina – Zaccana, a mountain of Basilicata
 Monte Spina, a mountain of Lombardy

Other places
 Spina, Minnesota, abandoned townsite in Great Scott Township, Saint Louis County, Minnesota, U.S.

People 
 Alessandro Spina (1927-2013), the pen name of Basili Shafik Khouzam
 Alphonso de Spina (died 491), Spanish Franciscan Catholic Bishop, author of a Classification of demons
 Angelo Spina (born 1954), Italian Roman Catholic prelate who serves as the current archbishop of Ancona-Osimo
 Ashley Spina (born 1992), Australian soccer player
 Ben Spina (born 1988), Australian professional rugby league footballer
 Dave Spina (born 1983), American professional ice hockey right winger
 Francis X. Spina (born 1946), former Associate Justice of the Massachusetts Supreme Judicial Court
 Franz Spina (1868-1938), German-Czechoslovakian right-wing and activist politician of the First era
 Harold Spina (1906-1997), American composer of popular songs
 Joanie Spina (1953-2014), American dancer, choreographer, magician and director
 Joe Spina (born 1946), former politician in Ontario, Canada
 Joey Spina (born 1977), American professional boxer
 Lane Spina (born 1962 or 1963), American freestyle skier
 Laurie Spina (born 1963), rugby league commentator and an Australian former professional rugby league footballer
 Maria Grazia Spina (born 1936), Italian television, film and stage actress
 Scipione Spina (died 1639), Roman Catholic Bishop of Lecce

Anatomy 
 Spina helicis, a small projection of cartilage at the front part of the auricula
 Spina iliaca posterior inferior, at the posterior and inferior surface of the iliac bone
 Spina iliaca posterior superior, the posterior border of the ala of sacrum
 Spina ischiadica, from the posterior border of the body of the Ischium
 Spina nasalis anterior maxillae, bony projection in the skull in the order of cephalometric landmark
 Spina nasalis posterior ossis palatini, attachment of the musculus uvulae
 Spina suprameatica, at the inner end of the external acoustic meatus, in the tympanic membrane
 Spina ventosa, a skeletal manifestation of tuberculosis
 Spina vestibuli, a triangular thickening near the coronary sinus

Zoology 
 Cingulina spina, a species of sea snail, a marine gastropod mollusk in the family Pyramidellidae
 Damochlora spina, a species of air-breathing land snails, terrestrial pulmonate gastropod mollusks 
 Pollex spina, a moth of the family Erebidae

Other uses 
 Santa Maria della Spina, a small church in Pisa, Italy
 Assunta Spina (1915 film), a 1915 Italian silent film
 Parco Spina Verde di Como, regional natural park in Lombardy, Italy
 Peggy Spina Tap Company, an American tap dance company 
 Ziziphus spina-christi or Christ's thorn jujube, an evergreen plant native to northern and tropical Africa
 Spina of a hippodrome, a low wall running most of the length of a hippodrome and dividing the course